Luigi Castaldo (born 2 May 1982) is an Italian footballer who plays as a forward for Afragolese in the Italian Serie D.

Career
Castaldo was born near Naples, and throughout his sporting career, he played on football teams in the Campania Region. Puteolana, Juve Stabia, Benevento, Nocerina and then with the Avellino.

The 2013–14 season is his 3rd season in the Italian Serie B, and the 14th since he became a professional footballer. On 24 August, he returned to score in Serie B, the first day of the season against Novara.

On 6 August 2021, he signed with Paganese.

References

1982 births
People from Giugliano in Campania
Footballers from Campania
Living people
Italian footballers
Serie B players
Serie C players
Association football midfielders
A.C. Ancona players
S.S. Juve Stabia players
Benevento Calcio players
U.S. Avellino 1912 players
Casertana F.C. players
Paganese Calcio 1926 players